Zrębin  is a village in the administrative district of Gmina Połaniec, within Staszów County, Świętokrzyskie Voivodeship, in south-central Poland.

The village has a population of  395.

Demography 
According to the 2002 Poland census, there were 377 people residing in Zrębin village, of whom 50.1% were male and 49.9% were female. In the village, the population was spread out, with 26.3% under the age of 18, 40.3% from 18 to 44, 15.6% from 45 to 64, and 17.8% who were 65 years of age or older.
 Figure 1. Population pyramid of village in 2002 — by age group and sex

References

Villages in Staszów County